William Joseph Keene (August 4, 1915 – May 23, 1992) was an American radio and television actor who appeared on several popular television shows more than one separate occasion as a different character. He appeared in shows more than once as a different character such as The Andy Griffith Show, Perry Mason and Mayberry R.F.D.. In 1958, he played the banker Mr. Botkin in the Gunsmoke episode "Kitty Caught" (Season 3, Episode 19). In 1961 he appeared on the television show Twilight Zone in the episodes "The Midnight Sun" and "The Prime Mover", and in an episode of The Asphalt Jungle. He also appeared in "Lamb to the Slaughter", a classic 1958 episode of Alfred Hitchcock Presents. Among his five appearances on Perry Mason, the last two were as Judge Seymour in the show's final season.

Filmography

External links

American male television actors
1915 births
1992 deaths
20th-century American male actors
Male actors from Pennsylvania